The 1921 USC Trojans football team represented the University of Southern California (USC) in the 1921 college football season. In their third year under head coach Gus Henderson, the Trojans compiled a 10–1 record and outscored their opponents by a combined total of 362 to 52.

Schedule

References

USC Trojans
USC Trojans football seasons
USC Trojans football